Remote desktop is a software or operating system that allows remotely controlling or logging into a desktop via a network connection.

Remote desktop or Remote Desktop may also refer to:
 Desktop sharing
 Apple Remote Desktop
 Remote Desktop Connection, formerly Remote Desktop, a Microsoft Windows component
 Remote Desktop Services, or simply Remote Desktop, a Windows Server component

See also
 Remote Desktop Protocol (RDP)